Kainzenbad station is a railway station in the municipality of Garmisch-Partenkirchen, located in the Garmisch-Partenkirchen district in Bavaria, Germany.

Operation
The station has only been used for New Year's jumping at the nearby Große Olympiaschanze since 1984 anymore.

Future
It is planned to permanently reactivate the Kainzenbad stop. However, the new platform is to be built south-east of the old stop on the other side of the tracks to provide better access to the ski stadium and the Garmisch-Partenkirchen hospital. The costs of the reactivation would be borne by Deutsche Bahn if a study yet to be prepared concludes that 100 accesses per day will be achieved.

Notable places nearby
Große Olympiaschanze

References

Railway stations in Garmisch-Partenkirchen
Buildings and structures in Garmisch-Partenkirchen (district)